Gürgentepe is a small town and mountainous district of Ordu Province in the Black Sea region of Turkey,  inland from the city of Ordu. According to the 2000 census, population of the district is 36,860 of which 18,313 live in the town of Gürgentepe.

Features

Gürgentepe is a district of steep mountain valleys on the road between the cities of Ordu and Sivas, both transportation and agriculture are very difficult. The climate is typical of the Black Sea region with the north winds bringing humidity and much rain off the sea, although the inland side of the mountains have a dry climate. Most of the district is mountainside covered with forest and shrubs, trees including oak, chestnut and alder. The soil is volcanic, fertile and watered by mountain streams but most of the land is too steep for planting.

The villages of Gürgentepe district include Alaseher, Bahtiyarlar, Dikenlice, Gülbelen, Gültepe, Hisarcıkpınarı, Şirinköy, Tepeköy, and Tuzla.

Notes

References

External links
 District governor's official website 
 Road map of Gürgentepe and environs
 Various images of Gürgentepe, Ordu

Populated places in Ordu Province
Districts of Ordu Province